Miracle on 42nd Street is a 2017 documentary film that delves into the history and impact of the Manhattan Plaza apartment complex in the Hell's Kitchen neighborhood in New York City. The documentary is narrated by Chazz Palminteri and features interviews with people involved with the development of the project as well as previous tenants such as Alicia Keys, Terrence Howard, Donald Faison, Larry David, Samuel L. Jackson (who worked at Manhattan Plaza as a doorman), and many others. It is directed by Alice Elliott, an Academy Award-nominated filmmaker. Mary Jo Slater, the producer, and Lisa Shreve, the consulting editor, are both previous tenants of the building. The film opened in November 2017 at the Doc NYC film festival.

The film won Best Feature Documentary at the Franklin International Independent Film Festival. The film won the 2020 New York Emmy Award for Best Documentary. The documentary was released on DVD on January 15, 2020.

Cast
Previous residents

References

External links
 
 

2017 documentary films
Films set in Manhattan
42nd Street (Manhattan)